Jeffrey Douglas Foster (born May 24, 1977) is a former American professional basketball player who spent the entirety of his 13-year career with the Indiana Pacers of the NBA.

Early life and college
Foster was born in San Antonio, Texas and graduated from James Madison High School in San Antonio in 1995. In senior year, he joined the varsity basketball team in high school. He attended Southwest Texas State University and finished college nine credits short of a degree in finance. With the Southwest Texas State Bobcats, Foster averaged 12.8 points and 10.2 rebounds in his junior season and was part of the All-Southland Conference Second-Team in 1998.

NBA career
He was selected 21st overall by the Golden State Warriors in the 1999 NBA Draft out of Southwest Texas State University, but his draft rights were immediately traded to the Pacers in exchange for Vonteego Cummings and a future first-round draft pick.

Foster was part of the Pacers' 1999–2000 Eastern Conference championship team, though he played only 19 games that year as he was fourth on the Pacers' depth chart at center behind Rik Smits, Sam Perkins and Zan Tabak.  In his second season, he played in 71 games, gaining a spot in the rotation as the Pacers rebuilt for the future.  He averaged 3.5 points and 5.5 rebounds per game while averaging only 16.2 minutes per contest.

Foster began the 2001–02 season as the starter, and started 48 games that year before Brad Miller was acquired in a trade with the Chicago Bulls.  Nevertheless, Foster played in all 82 games for the first time in his career, averaging 5.7 points and 6.8 rebounds per game.

Miller remained the Pacers' starting center throughout the 2002–03 season, and as such Foster was relegated back to the bench, and he produced his lowest point total yet of his career (2.1 ppg) and grabbed only 3.6 rebounds per game.

Before the 2003–04 season, Brad Miller was traded to the Sacramento Kings, and newly acquired Scot Pollard began as the starting center.  But Foster distinguished himself in the Pacers' season opener against the Detroit Pistons and his play, combined with Pollard's poor play, meant a return to the starting line-up for Foster. The energetic, hard-working center became an important rebounding presence for the Pacers, and his offensive rebounds, in particular, combined with well-timed tip-ins, finally endeared himself to Indiana fans.

Foster sustained a back injury in December 2009 and underwent surgery on February 16, 2010.

Foster announced his retirement on March 21, 2012. He cited chronic back issues as the reason for his departure from the game. At the time of his retirement, Foster ranked 8th all-time in total rebound rate and 4th all-time in offensive rebound rate.

NBA career statistics

Regular season 

|-
| align="left" | 
| align="left" | Indiana
| 19 || 0 || 4.5 || .565 || .000 || .680 || 1.7 || .3 || .3 || .1 || 2.3
|-
| align="left" | 
| align="left" | Indiana
| 71 || 9 || 16.2 || .469 || .286 || .516 || 5.5 || .5 || .5 || .4 || 3.5
|-
| align="left" | 
| align="left" | Indiana
| 82 || 48 || 21.8 || .449 || .133 || .610 || 6.8 || .9 || .9 || .5 || 5.7
|-
| align="left" | 
| align="left" | Indiana
| 77 || 2 || 10.4 || .360 || .000 || .540 || 3.6 || .7 || .4 || .3 || 2.1
|-
| align="left" | 
| align="left" | Indiana
| 82 || 79 || 23.9 || .544 || .000 || .669 || 7.4 || .8 || .9 || .3 || 6.1
|-
| align="left" | 
| align="left" | Indiana
| 61 || 43 || 26.1 || .519 || .000 || .634 || 9.0 || .7 || .8 || .2 || 7.0
|-
| align="left" | 
| align="left" | Indiana
| 63 || 37 || 25.1 || .552 || .000 || .604 || 9.1 || .8 || .7 || .4 || 5.9
|-
| align="left" | 
| align="left" | Indiana
| 75 || 43 || 23.2 || .469 || .000 || .639 || 8.1 || .8 || .8 || .5 || 4.3
|-
| align="left" | 
| align="left" | Indiana
| 77 || 52 || 24.5 || .550 || .000 || .593 || 8.7 || 1.7 || .7 || .4 || 6.4
|-
| align="left" | 
| align="left" | Indiana
| 74 || 26 || 24.7 || .501 || .286 || .658 || 6.9 || 1.8 || .7 || .7 || 6.1
|-
| align="left" | 
| align="left" | Indiana
| 16 || 3 || 15.9 || .478 || .000 || .556 || 5.1|| 1.3 || .2 || .3 || 3.1
|-
| align="left" | 
| align="left" | Indiana
| 56 || 3 || 16.8 || .479 || .000 || .563 || 6.3 || .8 || .4 || .6 || 3.3
|-
| align="left" | 
| align="left" | Indiana
| 11 || 0 || 12.8 || .500 || 1.000 || .667 || 3.8 || .4 || .7 || .1 || 2.3
|- class="sortbottom"
| style="text-align:center;" colspan="2"| Career
| 764 || 345 || 20.6 || .497 || .130 || .615 || 6.9 || .9 || .7 || .4 || 4.9

Playoffs 

|-
| align="left" | 2001
| align="left" | Indiana
| 4 || 2 || 13.0 || .444 || .000 || 1.000 || 3.0 || .5 || .0 || .8 || 2.5
|-
| align="left" | 2002
| align="left" | Indiana
| 5 || 0 || 15.6 || .538 || .500 || .444 || 4.8 || 1.4 || .6 || .2 || 4.0
|-
| align="left" | 2003
| align="left" | Indiana
| 6 || 0 || 6.3 || .545 || .000 || 1.000 || 1.3 || .3 || .0 || .5 || 2.3
|-
| align="left" | 2004
| align="left" | Indiana
| 16 || 13 || 19.2 || .581 || .000 || .800 || 6.6 || .8 || .8 || .3 || 3.6
|-
| align="left" | 2005
| align="left" | Indiana
| 13 || 0 || 18.8 || .596 || .000 || .714 || 7.4 || .4 || .5 || .9 || 5.9
|-
| align="left" | 2006
| align="left" | Indiana
| 4 || 4 || 20.0 || .364 || .000 || .750 || 6.0 || .8 || 1.0 || .3 || 2.8
|-
| align="left" | 2011
| align="left" | Indiana
| 5 || 0 || 18.6 || .583 || .000 || .375 || 4.8 || .8 || .4 || .8 || 3.4
|- class="sortbottom"
| style="text-align:center;" colspan="2"| Career
| 53 || 19 || 16.8 || .556 || .400 || .661 || 5.5 || .7 || .5 || .5 || 3.9

See also 
 List of NBA players who have spent their entire career with one franchise

References

External links

1977 births
Living people
American men's basketball players
Basketball players from San Antonio
Centers (basketball)
Golden State Warriors draft picks
Indiana Pacers players
Power forwards (basketball)
Texas State Bobcats men's basketball players